This is a list of all managers of Società Sportiva Lazio.

List of managers
Lazio have had many managers and head coaches throughout their history, below is a chronological list of them from when Serie A was changed into a league format, from 1901 onward.

Trophies
Managers of Lazio who won at least one trophy during their tenure:

Footnotes

 
Lazio